Palatka Municipal Airport , also known as Lieutenant Kay Larkin Field, is a city-owned, public-use airport located two nautical miles (4 km) northwest of the central business district of Palatka, a city in Putnam County, Florida, United States. It is included in the National Plan of Integrated Airport Systems for 2011–2015, which categorized it as a general aviation facility.

History
On June 1, 1942, the U.S. Navy, under a government lease, acquired the airport from the City of Palatka, and in 1943, acquired additional land in support of naval air training operations, primarily U.S. Navy and U.S. Marine Corps F4U Corsair fighter training, under the cognizance of the Naval Air Station Jacksonville complex to the north. On August 21, 1942, the airport was officially named Kay Larkin Field for 1st Lieutenant J. K. "Kay" Larkin, a U.S. Army Air Forces instructor pilot and Palatka native killed during the Second World War. In 1946, the War Assets Administration turned the airport back over to the City of Palatka.

In the early 1960s, it appeared likely that commercial air service would be initiated in the Palatka area. In September 1963, South Central Airlines started servicing Palatka and the Central Florida area and continued for approximately two years, discontinuing service in 1965. That terminal building remains in operation today, primarily in support of general aviation operations. Shortly following discontinuance of commercial air service, the city leased operation to outside fixed-base operators (FBOs), but resumed complete operation in the early 1980s. In 2010, the city opened a new  terminal building.

Facilities and aircraft 
Palatka Municipal Airport covers an area of 703 acres (284 ha) at an elevation of 48 feet (15 m) above mean sea level. It has three asphalt paved runways: 9/27 is 6,000 by 100 feet (1,829 x 30 m); 17/35 is 3,510 by 75 feet (1,070 x 23 m); 12/30 is 3,000 by 75 feet (914 x 23 m).

For the 12-month period ending September 9, 2009, the airport had 32,619 aircraft operations, an average of 89 per day: 99% general aviation, 1% air taxi, and <1% military. At that time there were 50 aircraft based at this airport: 86% single-engine and 14% multi-engine.

References

External links
  brochure from CFASPP
 

Airports in Florida
Transportation buildings and structures in Putnam County, Florida
Palatka, Florida
1938 establishments in Florida
Airports established in 1938